Jafal Rashed Al Kuwari (born on September 27, 1972) is a former Qatari footballer who was a midfielder for Al Sadd. He was also a member of the Qatar national football team, as well as being the captain of the Qatar national team. He is one of the shortest football player in the world. He officially retired from professional football in a 2009 farewell match held against AC Milan. He is currently the team manager and spokesman of Al Sadd since 2009. Additionally, he plays for the Qatar beach football team.

Career
Jafal played alongside his brother, Fahad Rashed Al-Kuwari, in the 1992 Summer Olympics for the Qatar U-23 side.

External links

References

1972 births
Living people
Qatari footballers
Al Sadd SC players
Qatar Stars League players
Qatar international footballers
Footballers at the 1992 Summer Olympics
Olympic footballers of Qatar
Association football midfielders